Stephen Andrew Churm (born 16 July 1954) is an Australian sailor. He was selected to represent Australia at the 2012 Summer Paralympics in sailing. He did not medal at the 2012 Games.

Personal
Churm was born on 16 July 1954, and is from the Sydney area in New South Wales. He has left-sided Klumpke palsy as a result of a torn brachial plexus during birth.

Churm is married and has three children. , he lives in Como West, New South Wales and is retired.

Sailing
Churm is a sailor, and is a member of the Rushcutters Bay based Sailability Rushcutters Bay Yacht Club. , he had a sailing scholarship with the New South Wales Institute of Sport.

Churm started sailing in 1962 as a seven-year-old at the Connells Point Sailing Club in the MK1 class, racing for the first time at a club event in 1963. He won his first race in 1966 in the Conells Point SC competition when he was in the Heron ‘Mischief’. In the Heron class at the Mrs R Woods Forward hands trophy later that year, he came in first. He tried to qualify for the 2000 Summer Paralympics but just missed out on selection. He first represented Australia in 2002 at the World Championships, where he finished seventh alongside Jonathan Harris and Zoltan Pegan in Medemblink. At the 2003 Ransa Twilights, competing in the Sonar, he finished third in the second position.  The following year, he finished twelfth in the third position.

Churm competed in the 2012 IFDS World Championships in the sonar event in a boat that included Colin Harrison and Jonathan Harris.  It was the first time the trio had sailed together. At the 2012 Dutch-hosted World Cup, he and his teammates finished third in the Sonar Paralympic class. He competed in the Macquarie 2012 Access World Championships. He was selected to represent Australia at the 2012 Summer Paralympics in sailing. He did not medal at the 2012 Games.

References

External links
 
 

1954 births
Living people
Australian male sailors (sport)
Paralympic sailors of Australia
Sailors at the 2012 Summer Paralympics
New South Wales Institute of Sport alumni